A color commentator or expert commentator is a sports commentator who assists the main (play-by-play) commentator, typically by filling in when play is not in progress. The phrase "colour commentator" is primarily used in Canadian English and the phrase "color commentator" is now rarely used in American English as the role is now more commonly known in the USA as "game analyst" or "match analyst". The person may also be referred to as a summariser (outside North America) or analyst (a term used throughout the English-speaking world). The color analyst and main commentator will often exchange comments freely throughout the broadcast, when the main commentator is not describing the action. The color commentator provides expert analysis and background information, such as statistics, strategy, and injury reports on the teams and athletes, and occasionally anecdotes or light humor. Color commentators are often former athletes or coaches of the sport being broadcast.

The term color refers to levity and insight provided by a secondary announcer. A sports color commentator customarily works alongside the play-by-play broadcaster.

United States and Canada
Commentary teams typically feature one professional commentator describing the passage of play, and another, usually a former player or coach, providing supplementary input as the game progresses. Color commentators usually restrict their input to times that the ball or the puck is out of play, or there is no significant action on the field or the court. They usually defer to the main commentator when a shot on goal or another significant event occurs. That sometimes results in them being talked over or cut short by the primary commentator. Former players and managers also appear as pundits and carry out a similar role to that of the co-commentator during the pre-game show before a given contest and the post-game show after it.

In American motorsports coverage, there may be as many as two color commentators in the booth for a given broadcast. 

In the 2010s, sports broadcasters began to increasingly deploy a "rules analyst", who provides opinions and insights on calls made by referees and is typically also a former official. The practice was first popularized in the NFL, with Fox hiring former officials Mike Pereira and Dean Blandino. The practice has since been extended taking to other sports, with officials such as Steve Javie (basketball), Don Koharski (hockey), and Mark Clattenburg (soccer) having taken on similar roles.

United Kingdom
In the United Kingdom, the term "color commentator" is largely unknown. The equivalent role is usually called "summariser" but other terms used are "analyst", "pundit" or simply "co-commentator". Cricket coverage on ESPNcricinfo uses similar terminology.

Australia and New Zealand 
The term is not used in Australia or New Zealand. Those giving the analysis alongside the main commentator are sometimes said to be giving additional or expert analysis, or "special comments", or they may be referred to as "expert commentators".

Latin America
For Association football broadcasts on Latin American sports television channels, such a commentator is called a comentarista in both Spanish and Portuguese and contrasts with the narrador, locutor (Spanish and Portuguese) or relator (Portuguese) who leads the transmission. The term "color" is not used or translated.

References

Sports mass media people
 
Broadcasting occupations